Bernard Luttikhuizen (born 28 November 1947) is a retired Dutch rower. He competed at the 1972 Summer Olympics in the coxed pairs, together with René Kieft and Herman Zaanen, but failed to reach the final.

References

1947 births
Living people
Dutch male rowers
Olympic rowers of the Netherlands
Rowers at the 1972 Summer Olympics
Sportspeople from Beverwijk